Greed is a game show that originally aired in the United States on Fox. Its success in the U.S. led to it becoming a worldwide franchise as the show was adapted and recreated in several other countries.

Furthermore, these had different music (the British version added extra sound effects in its title sequence), composed by Graham Ness, and graphics set around a safe and a tower of gold bars, however, the gameplay was largely the same as the original U.S. version, aside mainly from the Australian version, which had a progressive jackpot. The standard international set was designed by Andy Walmsley.

All the international versions were produced by Pearson Television (now Fremantle).

International versions

See also
List of television show franchises

References

Bibliography

Television lists by series
Television franchises